The Americas Cup was a biennial men's team golf tournament between teams of amateurs golfers from the United States, Canada and Mexico. It was held nine times between 1952 and 1967. The United States won all the matches except in 1965 when Canada won the cup.

The matches followed on from an informal match that had been played in 1951 at Saucon Valley Country Club between teams from the United States and Canada. A trophy was donated by Jerome P. Bowes, Jr.

The event was held in even-numbered years from 1952 to 1960 when there was no Walker Cup match. However from 1961 to 1967 it was held in odd-numbered years, to avoid clashing with the Eisenhower Trophy which started in 1958 and was held in even-numbered years. The venue cycled between the United States, Canada and Mexico. 

Until 1967 teams consisted of seven players, six of whom played in each session. In 1967 the teams were reduced to five with four playing in each session.

All nine events were held over two days. Matchplay threesomes were used in which each of the three played the other two simultaneously. Alternate-shot matches were played as well as single matches. In 1952 and 1954, 36-hole matches were played with extra holes played to obtain a result. There were three sets of alternate-shot matches on the first day and six sets of singles on the second day. From 1956, all matches were over 18 holes; extra holes were not played. Until 1967, there were three sets of alternate-shot matches and six sets of singles on both days. In 1967, there were only two sets of alternate-shot matches and four sets of singles each day.

Results

Appearances
The following are those who have played in at least one of the matches.

United States
 Don Allen 1965, 1967
 Rex Baxter 1958
 Deane Beman 1960, 1961, 1963
 Joe Campbell 1956
 William C. Campbell 1952, 1954, 1956, 1965, 1967
 Don Cherry 1954, 1960
 Charles Coe 1952, 1954, 1958, 1960, 1961, 1963
 Joe Conrad 1954, 1956
 Richard Davies 1963
 Bob Dickson 1967
 Dave Eichelberger 1965
 Joe Gagliardi 1952
 Robert W. Gardner 1961
 Vinny Giles 1967
 Downing Gray 1965, 1967
 Labron Harris Jr. 1963
 John Mark Hopkins 1965
 Bill Hyndman 1958, 1960, 1961
 John Konsek 1960
 Dale Morey 1954, 1965
 Jack Nicklaus 1960, 1961
 Billy Joe Patton 1954, 1956, 1958, 1963
 Hillman Robbins 1956, 1958
 Charlie Smith 1961
 Frank Stranahan 1952
 R. H. Sikes 1963
 Bud Taylor 1958, 1960
 Ed Tutwiler 1965
 Ed Updegraff 1963
 Sam Urzetta 1952
 Ken Venturi 1952, 1956
 Harvie Ward 1952, 1954, 1956, 1958
 Dudley Wysong 1961

Canada
 Keith Alexander 1960, 1961, 1963, 1965, 1967
 Doug Bajus 1956, 1958
 Gordon Ball 1958
 Phil Brownlee 1960
 Bruce Castator 1958
 Percy Clogg 1952
 Gary Cowan 1958, 1960, 1961, 1963, 1965, 1967
 Don Doe 1954
 Phil Farley 1952, 1954
 Bob Fleming 1954
 Ted Homenuik 1961
 Eric Hudson 1958
 John Johnston 1958, 1960, 1961, 1965, 1967
 Peter Kelly 1952
 Ben Kern 1967
 Jerry Kesserling 1952
 Bob Kidd 1956, 1958
 George Knudson 1956
 Joe Leblanc 1956
 Gordon Mackenzie 1956
 Jerry Magee 1956
 Bill Mawhinney 1952^
 Walter McElroy 1952, 1954
 Moe Norman 1954
 Bill Pidlaski 1963, 1965
 John Russell 1967
 Douglas Silverberg 1954, 1956, 1963, 1965
 Bert Ticehurst 1961, 1963, 1965
 Bill Wakeham 1963
 Nick Weslock 1952, 1954, 1960, 1961, 1963, 1965
 Ron Willey 1960
 Bob Wylie 1960, 1961

Mexico
 Hector Alvarez 1960, 1961, 1967
 Reynaldo Avila 1952
 Carlos Belmont 1952, 1954
 Luis Brauer 1963
 Percy Clifford 1952
 Alejandro Cumming 1952, 1954, 1956
 Juan Antonio Estrada 1954, 1956, 1958, 1960, 1961, 1963, 1965, 1967
 Enrique Farias 1958, 1961
 Fernando Garza 1960
 Fernando Gonzalez 1952
 Roberto Halpern 1960, 1961, 1965, 1967
 Tomás Lehmann 1956, 1960, 1961, 1963, 1965, 1967
 Ignacio Lopez 1956, 1958
 Fernando Mendez 1954, 1956, 1958
 Jorge Molinar 1965
 Roberto Morris 1952, 1954
 Jose Luis Ortega 1958, 1963
 Carlos Porraz 1952^, 1954
 Rafael Quiroz 1958, 1960, 1961, 1963
 Antonio Rivas 1954, 1956
 Armando Rivero 1956
 Agustin Silveyra 1963, 1965
 Mauricio Urdaneta 1958, 1960, 1961, 1963, 1965
 Ricardo Vega 1965

^ In the final team but did not play in any matches.

References

Team golf tournaments
Amateur golf tournaments
Recurring sporting events established in 1952
Recurring sporting events disestablished in 1967